MV Zelek Star is a Turkish cargo ship which ran aground in two separate occasions in 2013 and 2019.

Description 
It is propelled by a single screw. The ship's port of registry is Panama, and it is owned by the Turkish company Fuden Shipping & Trading.

History 
The ship's keel was laid down in Taixing, China, under the name Bao Tai. It was built by Taizhou Yongtai Shipbuilding and was launched on 14 December 2005 and completed on 14 March 2005. Later that year, its name was changed to Zelek Star.

On 6 December 2013, Zelek Star was transiting through the Dnieper River to Constanta with a cargo of 4,452 tons of ammonium sulfate. The ship ran aground in the estuary off Karantinniy island, Ukraine. A tug was dispatched, which was able to assist in refloating Zelek Star without any injury to the crew or environmental contamination.

On 25 December 2019, Zelek Star was anchored off Ashdod, Israel, while transporting cement and other products from Greece. That night, a strong wind caused the ship to drag anchor and drift into the beach, grounding near the port breakwater. Zelek Star remained grounded on the beach until March 2020, when it was refloated after a channel had been dredged out to deeper waters.

References 

Cargo ships of Turkey
2004 ships